Allanblackia is a genus of flowering plant in the family Clusiaceae.  Molecular phylogenetic analyses indicate that is it nested in the dioecious Garcinia. The genus name commemorates Allan Black.

It contains the following species:

 Allanblackia floribunda (Nigeria to DR Congo and Angola)  
 Allanblackia gabonensis
 Allanblackia kimbiliensis 
 Allanblackia kisonghi 
 Allanblackia marienii
 Allanblackia parviflora (Upper Guinea, from Ghana westwards)
 Allanblackia staneriana 
 Allanblackia stuhlmannii (Eastern arc mountains -Usambara Tanzania)
 Allanblackia ulugurensis (Eastern arc mountains -Uluguru Tanzania)

Uses
Allanblackia can be processed into Allanblackia oil

References

 
Malpighiales genera
Taxonomy articles created by Polbot
Dioecious plants